The women's javelin throw event at the 1998 World Junior Championships in Athletics was held in Annecy, France, at Parc des Sports on 28 and 29 July.  An old specification 600g javelin was used.

Medalists

Results

Final
29 July

Qualifications
28 Jul

Group A

Group B

Participation
According to an unofficial count, 29 athletes from 22 countries participated in the event.

References

Javelin throw
Javelin throw at the World Athletics U20 Championships